Garakuiyeh (also Romanized as Garākū’īyeh; also known as Gāzerū’īyeh) is a village in Khorramdasht Rural District, in the Central District of Kuhbanan County, Kerman Province, Iran. At the 2006 census, its population was 50, in 13 families.

References 

Populated places in Kuhbanan County